SM Town Live '08 (stylized as SMTOWN Live '08) is the first joint concert tour of SM Entertainment artists.

Performers

Shows

References

12
2008 concert tours
2009 concert tours
K-pop concerts